The giant mudskipper (Periophthalmodon schlosseri) is a species of mudskipper native to the tropical shores of the eastern Indian Ocean and the western Pacific Ocean where it occurs in marine, brackish and fresh waters. It is most frequently found along muddy shores in estuaries as well as in the tidal zones of rivers. It lives in a burrow in the mud and emerges from the burrow at low tide on sunny days. It can move quickly across a muddy surface and is capable of breathing both in and out of water. The giant mudskipper can grow to a length of  TL.  This species is of minor importance to local commercial fisheries. The specific name honours the Dutch physician and naturalist Johann Albert Schlosser (1733-1769), who was a friend of Peter Simon Pallas and who received the type from the East Indies and sent it to Pallas.

References

giant mudskipper
Fish of India
Fish of Indonesia
Fish of Malaysia
Fish of New Guinea
Fish of Singapore
Fish of Thailand
Fish of Vietnam
giant mudskipper
giant mudskipper